Siaki Vikilani (born 7 August 2000) is a Canadian rugby union player, currently playing for the Toronto Arrows of Major League Rugby (MLR) and the Canadian national team. His preferred position is flanker or number 8.

Professional career
Vikilani signed for Major League Rugby side Toronto Arrows for the 2021 Major League Rugby season. Vikilani made his debut for Canada in the 2021 July rugby union tests.

References

External links
itsrugby.co.uk Profile

2000 births
Living people
Canadian people of Tongan descent
Canadian rugby union players
Canada international rugby union players
Rugby union flankers
Rugby union number eights
Toronto Arrows players
American Raptors players